The knockout stage of the 2000–01 UEFA Champions League featured the eight teams that had finished in the top two of each of the four groups in the second group stage and lasted from 3 April to 23 May 2001. The knockout stage followed a simple, single-elimination format, with the ties in each round (except for the final) being played over two legs, with whichever team scored the most goals over the course of the two legs progressing to the next round. In the case of both teams scoring the same number of goals over the two legs, the winner would be determined by whichever team scored more goals in their away leg. If the teams could still not be separated, a period of extra time lasting 30 minutes (split into two 15-minute halves) would be played. If the scores were still level after extra time, the winner would be decided by a penalty shoot-out. As in every season of the competition, the final was played as a single match at a neutral venue, which in 2001 was the San Siro in Milan, Italy.

The final pitted three-time winners Bayern Munich of Germany against Spanish club Valencia, who were appearing in their second consecutive final, with Bayern winning 5–4 on penalties after the two teams could not be separated through 90 minutes and extra time. Bayern reached the final by knocking out the competition's last two champions – Manchester United (who had beaten Bayern in the 1999 final) and Real Madrid, who beat Valencia in 2000. Valencia, meanwhile, had to play two English sides en route to the final, first beating Arsenal then Leeds United. The other teams involved in the knockout stage were Galatasaray of Turkey and Deportivo La Coruña of Spain.

Bracket

Quarter-finals

|}

First leg
All times Central European Time (UTC+1)

The match was interrupted for three minutes after Galatasaray's third goal due to floodlight failure in the stadium.

Second leg
All times Central European Time (UTC+1)

Leeds United won 3–2 on aggregate.

2–2 on aggregate. Valencia won on away goals.

Real Madrid won 5–3 on aggregate.

Bayern Munich won 3–1 on aggregate.

Semi-finals

|}

First leg
All times Central European Time (UTC+1)

Second leg
All times Central European Time (UTC+1)

Valencia won 3–0 on aggregate.

Bayern Munich won 3–1 on aggregate.

Final

References

External links
2000–01 knockout stage matches at UEFA.com

Knockout Stage
2000-01